Lady Flora Elizabeth Rawdon-Hastings (11 February 1806 – 5 July 1839) was a British aristocrat and lady-in-waiting to Queen Victoria's mother, the Duchess of Kent. Her death in 1839 was the subject of a court scandal that gave the Queen a negative image.

Family
Lady Flora was one of the daughters of Francis Rawdon-Hastings, 1st Marquess of Hastings (1754–1826) and his wife Flora Mure-Campbell (1780–1840). Her siblings were George, Sophia, Selina, and Adelaide.

Scandal

The unmarried Lady Flora was alleged to have had an affair with Sir John Conroy, comptroller, "favourite" and also suspected lover of Queen Victoria's mother, the Duchess of Kent.

Background
The Duchess's daughter, Alexandrina Victoria (later Queen Victoria), detested Conroy, while Flora disliked the queen's adored friend and mentor, Baroness Lehzen, as well as the Prime Minister, Lord Melbourne.

As the Duchess of Kent's lady-in-waiting, Lady Flora was party to Conroy's infamous Kensington System by which he colluded with the Duchess to keep Victoria isolated from her Hanoverian uncles. For these reasons, the young Victoria hated and suspected Lady Flora, and was open to any accusation that might reflect negatively on Conroy or his aides. Once she ascended the throne in June 1837, Victoria made every attempt to keep her mother's household, including Lady Flora and Conroy, away from her in distant parts of Buckingham Palace. Her mother unsuccessfully insisted that Conroy and his family be allowed at court; Victoria disagreed, saying: "I thought you would not expect me to invite Sir John Conroy after his conduct towards me for some years past."

1839
Sometime in 1839, Lady Flora began to experience pain and swelling in her lower abdomen. She visited the queen's physician, Sir James Clark, who could not diagnose her condition without an examination, which she refused. Clark assumed the abdominal growth was pregnancy, and met with Lady Flora twice a week from 10 January to 16 February. As she was unmarried, his suspicions were hushed up. However, her enemies, Baroness Lehzen and the Marchioness of Tavistock (better known as the inventor of afternoon tea) spread the rumour that she was "with child", and eventually Lehzen told Melbourne about her fears. On 2 February, the queen wrote in her journal that she suspected Conroy, a man whom she loathed intensely, to be the father. Lady Flora felt that she had to defend herself in public, publishing her version of events in the form of a letter which appeared in The Examiner, and blaming "a certain foreign lady" (Lehzen) for spreading the rumours.

The accusations were proven false when Lady Flora finally consented to a physical examination by the royal doctors, who confirmed that she was not pregnant. She did, however, have an advanced cancerous liver tumour, and had only months left to live. With only two months to live, Lady Flora wrote in 1839 to her mother on the subject of the upcoming Eglinton Tournament, expressing her concern that one of the knights might be killed in the violent sport. Queen Victoria visited the now emaciated and clearly dying Lady Flora on 27 June.

Death
Lady Flora died in London on 5 July 1839, aged 33. She was buried at Loudoun Castle, her family home. Conroy and Lord Hastings, her brother, stirred up a press campaign against both the Queen and Doctor Clark which attacked them for insulting and disgracing Lady Flora with false rumours and for plotting against her and the entire Hastings family.

Published in The Morning Post, their campaign also condemned the queen's "fellow conspirators", Baroness Lehzen and Lady Tavistock, as the guilty parties who had originated the false rumour of pregnancy. These attempts fell far short of their goals of discrediting the queen and forcing her to appoint Conroy to some post close to her person. Victoria remained adamant that Conroy should never be close to the throne in any fashion. The next year, her marriage and subsequent pregnancy restored her to popular favour. Victoria remained haunted by guilty memories of Lady Flora, having nightmares about her for years afterwards.

Poetry

Hastings was also a poet; a collection of her work, Poems by the Lady Flora Hastings, was edited by her sister Sophia (later the Marchioness of Bute), and published posthumously. The publication received an enthusiastic review in The Literary Gazette, which commented:

A second edition of the poems was published in 1842.

Bibliography
 The Victim of Scandal. Memoir of the Late Lady Flora Hastings with the statement of the Marquis of Hastings, entire correspondence and a Portrait of her Ladyship (1839). Glasgow: Duncan Campbell.
 The Story of Lady Flora Hastings, reprinted from Ayrshire Notes and Queries in the Kilmarnock Standard (1884; 3rd edition, with appendix), Kilmarnock: James McKie Publishers.

References

1806 births
1839 deaths
1839 in the United Kingdom
British ladies-in-waiting
British people of Scottish descent
Deaths from cancer in England
Daughters of British marquesses
Daughters of Scottish earls
Deaths from liver cancer
Flora
Medical scandals in the United Kingdom
Place of birth missing
Women of the Regency era
English women poets
19th-century English poets
19th-century English women writers
19th-century British writers